Eric C. Williams (born July 17, 1972) is an American former professional basketball player who played in the National Basketball Association (NBA) from 1995 to 2007. He played for seven teams during his career, including two stints with the Boston Celtics.

Career
Following a collegiate career which began at Burlington County College in New Jersey, then two years at Vincennes University in Indiana, followed by Providence College in Rhode Island, the 6' 8" small forward was selected by the Boston Celtics with the 14th pick in the 1995 NBA Draft. He played two years with them before being traded to the Denver Nuggets during the 1997 offseason for a couple of second round draft picks. The Nuggets only got four games out of Williams during the 1997-98 campaign due to him tearing the anterior cruciate ligament in his right knee. The following season, he returned, but only played in 38 of 82 regular season games with Denver before they repatriated him back to Boston along with Danny Fortson and Eric Washington plus a future draft pick in exchange for Ron Mercer, Ronald "Popeye" Jones, and Dwayne Schintzius. His second tenure with the Celtics lasted over four seasons until they traded him to the Cleveland Cavaliers along with Tony Battie and Kedrick Brown in a swap for Ricky Davis, Chris Mihm, Michael Stewart, and a second round draft pick on December 15, 2003. He became a free agent after 50 games with the Cavaliers, and signed with the New Jersey Nets prior to the 2004–05 season. Williams was soon part of a blockbuster player trade when the Nets sent him, Aaron Williams, Alonzo Mourning and two future first-round draft picks to the Toronto Raptors for franchise player Vince Carter.

In 2005, Williams decided to launch his own line of clothing honoring the fictional Negro Basketball League.

On June 21, 2006, Williams was traded with Matt Bonner and a second round pick in the 2009 NBA Draft to San Antonio for Rasho Nesterovič and cash.

On February 13, 2007 he was traded along with the 2nd round pick in the 2009 NBA Draft that the Spurs got from the Raptors to the Charlotte Bobcats for Melvin Ely. On March 16, Williams was waived by the Bobcats to make room for Alan Anderson.

He holds career averages of 8.6 points, 3.3 rebounds and 1.4 assists per game.

Life outside basketball
Williams, whose wife was Jennifer Williams from 2007 to 2011, appeared in multiple episodes of the reality TV show Basketball Wives from seasons 1–4. Eric also went on to appear in the 2013 film The Caribbean Heist. In 2015 Williams was featured in the painting, "Freedom from What," an artwork by Pops Peterson based on "Freedom from Fear" by Norman Rockwell.

References

1972 births
Living people
African-American basketball players
American expatriate basketball people in Canada
American men's basketball players
Basketball players from Newark, New Jersey
Boston Celtics draft picks
Boston Celtics players
Charlotte Bobcats players
Cleveland Cavaliers players
Denver Nuggets players
Malcolm X Shabazz High School alumni
New Jersey Nets players
Providence Friars men's basketball players
San Antonio Spurs players
Shooting guards
Small forwards
Toronto Raptors players
Vincennes Trailblazers men's basketball players
21st-century African-American sportspeople
20th-century African-American sportspeople